Patrick Rosso (born 6 May 1969) is a French judoka.

Achievements

References

1969 births
Living people
French male judoka
People from La Ciotat
Sportspeople from Bouches-du-Rhône
Mediterranean Games gold medalists for France
Mediterranean Games medalists in judo
Competitors at the 1993 Mediterranean Games
20th-century French people